The 1955 Monaco Grand Prix was a Formula One motor race held at Monaco on 22 May 1955. It was race 2 of 7 in the 1955 World Championship of Drivers and was given an honorary name, Grand Prix d'Europe. The 100-lap race was won by Ferrari driver Maurice Trintignant after he started from ninth position. Eugenio Castellotti finished second for the Lancia team and Maserati drivers Jean Behra and Cesare Perdisa came in third.

Race report 

Stirling Moss had been signed by Mercedes for the new season and Maserati had replaced him with Jean Behra. The Silver Arrows of Fangio and Moss dominated, running 1–2 until half distance, trailed by Ascari and Castellotti. At the halfway mark, Fangio retired with transmission trouble, giving the lead to Moss. Almost a lap ahead, a seemingly sure win for Moss was ended on Lap 80 when his Benz's engine blew. The new leader, Ascari, miscalculated the chicane coming out of the tunnel, and his Lancia crashed through the barriers into the harbour. Ascari had to swim to safety. Maurice Trintignant, in a Ferrari 625 thought to be uncompetitive, inherited the lead and scored his first Formula One victory.

Mercedes driver Hans Herrmann injured himself in practice and was replaced by André Simon.

This race marked the Grand Prix debut for Cesare Perdisa. It was the only Grand Prix appearance for Ted Whiteaway. This was the last Grand Prix appearance for Alberto Ascari; he was killed four days later testing a Ferrari sports car at Monza.

It was the first win for Maurice Trintignant and Englebert tyres. It was also the first podium and points for Eugenio Castellotti and Cesare Perdisa, and the first win for a French Formula One driver.

Classification

Qualifying

Race

Notes
 – 1 point for fastest lap

Shared drives
 Car #34: Jean Behra (42 laps) and Cesare Perdisa (57 laps). They shared the 4 points for third place.
 Car #48: Piero Taruffi (50 laps) and Paul Frère (36 laps).
 Car #40: Cesare Perdisa (40 laps) and Jean Behra (46 laps).

Summary
 Formula 1 debut for Cesare Perdisa, who shared third place drive with Jean Behra, and Ted Whiteaway, who failed to quality
 Juan Manuel Fangio broke the track record that had stood since 1937, when Rudolf Caracciola turned a lap in 1:46.5 in a 5.6-litre Mercedes W125, running the circuit in 1:41.1 on the first day of practice in his Mercedes W196.
 Alberto Ascari matched Fangio's time in his Lancia D50 during the Saturday practice, though the order had been set on the first day of practice in a singular exception to the policy of the time of all practice laps counting towards grid position.
 In practice, Mercedes youngster Hans Herrmann crashed into a harbour wall and suffered injuries that took him out for the rest of the season.
 Ascari was driving the number 26 car, the same number that had been on the P2 Alfa Romeo his father, Antonio Ascari, had been driving when killed in the 26 July 1925 French Grand Prix. The superstitious Ascari was between Mercedes drivers Fangio and Stirling Moss in the numbers 2 and 6 respectively.
 Andre Simon's was the first Mercedes to leave the race, with engine failure. Of the other Mercedes, Fangio left the race with transmission problems on lap 50, leaving Stirling Moss in first and Ascari in second. Lap 80 saw Moss taken out by a minor problem in his car's sophisticated valve train, leaving Ascari in first. Ascari never made it past the pits to see that, however: his Lancia didn't make the chicane (possibly losing traction on oil from Moss's engine failure) and he flipped over the barrier and into the harbour. His Lancia was craned out of 25 feet of water while he spent the night in the hospital.
 Later events indicate that he probably should have kept his superstitions up and taken this as an omen, but his motivation wouldn't quit and four days later he was back in the cockpit at Monza, where he was killed in a bizarre accident testing a Ferrari on the 26th of the month. There are no definite explanations for either of Ascari's accidents, but the Monza incident was, apart from possible undetected brain injuries after the Monaco crash, probably caused by an improperly-sized tire – 7.00x16 rather than 6.50x16 – combined with an imperfect track surface.
 Mercedes also had not seen the last of their troubles – after all three cars left contention with mechanical problems at Monaco, the worst accident in racing history involved a Mercedes.
 Louis Chiron's start made him the oldest driver to start a Grand Prix (55 years, 292 days).

Championship standings after the race 
Drivers' Championship standings

 Note: Only the top five positions are included.

References

External links
 Kettlewell, Mike. "Monaco: Road Racing on the Riviera", in Northey, Tom, editor. World of Automobiles, Volume 12, pp. 1381–4. London: Orbis, 1974.

Monaco Grand Prix
Monaco Grand Prix
European Grand Prix
Grand Prix
Monaco Grand Prix